Luca Maniero (born 11 July 1998) is an Italian footballer who plays as a midfielder for Adriese.

Club career
He made his professional debut in the Serie B for Cittadella on 3 September 2016 in a game against Ternana.

On 3 August 2019, he joined Imolese on loan.

References

External links
 

1998 births
Sportspeople from Padua
Living people
Italian footballers
Association football midfielders
A.S. Cittadella players
Imolese Calcio 1919 players
Serie B players
Serie C players
Serie D players
Footballers from Veneto